Daniel Mitchley (born 7 October 1989) is an English footballer who plays as a forward for Skelmersdale United.

Career

From youth team to first team at Blackpool
Born in Liverpool, Mitchley played at Skelmersdale United until he was 15 years old. He then spent one season with the Oldham Athletic Centre of Excellence, followed by a short spell with Wigan Athletic's Centre of Excellence, before joining Blackpool, where he became a regular starter for the youth team in the Football League Youth Alliance, North West Conference.

By December 2007 Mitchley had scored 25 goals in just twelve matches for Blackpool's youth and reserve teams, and despite only just having turned eighteen, Blackpool manager Simon Grayson stated that he was "not frightened of throwing him into the action if I need to." Mitchley had been training with the first-team squad and had already travelled with them when he was included in the squad that went to Scunthorpe United. Grayson also confirmed that Mitchley would be training with the first team over the Christmas period and that he was close to a first team call up. By February 2008, Mitchley had scored 35 goals for the youth and reserve team in the 2007–08 season. However, he then suffered a broken foot, which kept him out of action for the rest of the season.

On 4 March 2008 Mitchley was offered his first professional contract, together with youth-team captain, Ashton Bayliss. On 6 May he won two awards at the club's annual presentation night: the Blackpool Supporters Association Young Player of the Year, and the Chris Muir Memorial Trophy for Young Player.

He made his return from injury on 15 October 2008 in a reserve-team match at Burnley. He was then included in the Blackpool squad for the first time in the Championship home match against Derby County on 21 October 2008, but was an unused substitute as the Seasiders won 3–2. Four days later, he made his professional debut when he came on as a late second-half substitute in the 89th minute for Gary Taylor-Fletcher at Bloomfield Road in a 2–2 draw with Crystal Palace.

Mitchley started the 2009–10 season with Blackpool and was twice an unused substitute. Firstly in the Seasiders 2–1 League Cup victory over Crewe Alexandra at Gresty Road on 11 August 2009. Then again on 15 August in a 1–1 draw with Cardiff City at Bloomfield Road. Mitchley spent most spells of 2009 and 2010 on loan at various lower league clubs. He was released by Blackpool in June 2010.

Loan moves whilst at Blackpool
On 27 March 2009, Mitchley signed for Conference North side Southport on loan for the rest of the 2008–09 season. He made his debut as a substitute the following day in the Sandgrounders 3–2 win over Stafford Rangers at Haig Avenue. He made a total of seven league appearances for Southport.

On 18 August 2009 he was loaned out to Northern Premier League side Burscough, along with fellow Blackpool player Mark Halstead. He made his debut on 22 August in a 0–4 home defeat to King's Lynn at Victoria Park. After two more substitute appearances, Mitchley made his full debut on 15 September in a 0–1 home loss to Stocksbridge Park Steels.

On 25 March 2010, Mitchley joined Conference National side Wrexham on a one-month loan deal. He made his debut two days later in a 3–0 win over Histon at the Racecourse Ground.

Non-league
On 27 October 2010, Burscough announced that they have captured the signing of Mitchley. He had a trial with Mansfield Town prior to him re-joining Burscough. He began his second stint at Burscough with a 3–2 defeat against F.C. Halifax Town.

Mitchley signed for Mansfield Town in November 2010 and scored on his debut against Forest Green Rovers, however was on the losing side, going down 2–1. He was originally released by Mansfield in May 2011, with still a year left on his contract, however he returned in the pre-season. Mansfield boss Paul Cox stated that Mitchley did not feature in his plans for 2011–12.

He joined Nuneaton Town on loan, and after scoring twice on his debut in the FA Cup, he failed to score again in 18 league appearances. He signed for Altrincham in the summer of 2012. Having struggled to break into the first team at Altrincham with only a handful of first team appearances, he went out on a 1-month loan spell to Marine. After returning to Altrincham, he had a second loan spell, this time at Kendal Town, where he scored on his debut.

Leaving Marine after four seasons, Mitchley moved to Radcliffe FC in the summer 2019. On 20 December 2019, he was loaned out to Witton Albion for one month. The deal was later extended for one mont further and he returned to Radcliffe on 20 February 2020.

In August 2020, he re-signed for Skelmersdale United of the North West Counties Football League, having spent five years away from the club.

Career statistics

Honours
Blackpool
Football League Championship play-off winner (1): 2009–10
Mansfield Town
FA Trophy runner up (1): 2011
Challenge Cup winner 1): 2015-16

References

External links

Danny Mitchley profile at blackpoolfc.co.uk

Living people
1989 births
English footballers
Altrincham F.C. players
Blackpool F.C. players
English Football League players
Southport F.C. players
Wrexham A.F.C. players
Mansfield Town F.C. players
Footballers from Liverpool
Burscough F.C. players
Nuneaton Borough F.C. players
Marine F.C. players
Skelmersdale United F.C. players
Kendal Town F.C. players
Radcliffe F.C. players
Witton Albion F.C. players
Association football forwards